CGSO may refer to:

Chief Government Security Office
Centergazservice-opt
Complete Game Shutout in baseball, see Complete game and Shutouts in baseball